You Quiz on the Block is a South Korean variety show program on tvN starring Yoo Jae-suk and Jo Se-ho.

The first 12 episodes aired on tvN from August 29 and ended on November 14, 2018. It is broadcast by tvN on Wednesdays at 23:00 (KST).

For 2019, the show was aired from April 16 and ended on December 3 on Tuesdays at 23:00 (KST).

Since March 11, 2020, the show is broadcast on Wednesdays, initially at 21:00 (KST). Air time has been moved to 20:40 (KST) since October 2020.

Synopsis 
The show is about Yoo Jae-suk and Jo Se-ho who enter ordinary people's everyday lives, chat with them, and give them surprise quizzes. The talk and quiz show program will spotlight these people's lives and aims to gift them a refreshing, different kind of day.

Season 1 (2018)
 In episode 1 – 5, the challenger will randomly pick a set of questions, with Yoo giving the questions and Jo supporting the challenger. Each challenger will receive ₩1,000,000 after answering 5 questions correctly in a row and if it cannot be done, he/she will receive a token of appreciation from the staff. Each challenger can choose to use any of the help-seeking opportunities:(If any of the help-seeking opportunities is used in a question, it will not be available for the later questions)
 An acquaintance call;
 Discuss with Jo Se-ho;
 Discuss with the members of the public;
 In episode 6 – 12, the questions are divided into objective questions and subjective questions. The challenger must choose one type of question to answer.
Objective questions - Each challenger will receive ₩1,000,000 if he/she can answer 3 questions correctly in a row.
Subjective questions - Each challenger will receive ₩1,000,000 if he/she answer the question correctly.

Yoo and Jo will start their quizzing trip as early as 8:30 am and must stop by 6 pm as part of the "work-life balance" policy.

The show temporarily ended for the year due to the seasonal cold weather making the interview almost impossible for the casts and participants. The show will continue in 2019 once the weather has warmed up.

Season 2 (2019)
The show returns with an upgrade to the quiz. The question bank consists of keyword cards, and the challenger chooses one to answer the card's question. If the challenger answers correctly he/she wins ₩1,000,000, and has the option to go for a second question or just stop and take the ₩1,000,000 that was won. If the challenger gets the second question correctly, the prize money doubles to ₩2,000,000, otherwise the prize money will immediately become zero. In addition, when the program's logo was found on the back of the keyword card that was picked, if the challenger answers that question correctly, he/she wins ₩1,000,000 and the show will donate ₩1,000,000 to a charity organisation under his/her name.

The show temporarily ended for the year and resumed on March 11, 2020.

Season 3 & 4 (2020 - 2023)

2020
Due to the COVID-19 pandemic in South Korea, the show will be filmed indoors instead of on the streets. The show returns with Dearest Quiz, a new version of quiz in which one citizen connected through online, as question giver, asks the challenger a question, and if the challenger answers it correctly, both persons would get ₩1,000,000 each. If the challenger answers wrongly, both would get tokens of appreciation chosen by spinning the wheel. Citizens can apply as question givers on the show's homepage.

There were no new episodes on April 1 and 8, 2020 in the wake of COVID-19 and the show was replaced in the time slot by other programs.

2021
Episode originally planned for August 4, 2021 was cancelled due to one of the filming staff having tested positive for COVID-19, and instead an edited version of the previous episodes was aired in its place. Episode for September 22, 2021 was cancelled because a special movie (Deliver Us from Evil) was shown for the Chuseok holidays in its time slot. In each of the cases, the show resumed to the regular programming the subsequent week.

The episode on December 29, 2021, was replaced with a special version titled "Stories that Surprised You (당신을 놀라게 한 이야기)" based on previous episodes possibly because Yoo Jae-suk was tested positive for COVID-19. New episode resumed on January 12, 2022.

2022
On January 28, it was reported that Jo Se-ho had been diagnosed with COVID-19. On February 4, it was confirmed that Jo would return to normal. having recovered from COVID-19 infection. However, he did not participate in episode 142 (February 16), with Lee Malnyeon temporarily taking his place and airing on 9:45 PM, about 1 hour later than usual.

March 9 was the day of the 2022 South Korean presidential election, and a special episode called "Choice that Changed Your Life (인생을 바꾼 선택)" was aired in the place of a normal episode.

Episode 150 (April 20) garnered controversy and criticism of political bias for featuring Yoon Suk-yeol, the president-elect of South Korea at the time, and the video clip of his appearance in the show ended up not being uploaded to tvN's on-demand video service unlike other guests.

June 1 is the day of the 2022 South Korean local elections, and a new episode will not be aired that day.

On July 12, it was confirmed that the show will go on a break after the episode on July 20, and the show resumed airing from October 5.

Due to mourning the deaths of Itaewon disaster, there was no broadcast on November 2, the show resumed airing on November 9.

Airtime

Cast

Episodes

Ratings 
 Ratings listed below are the individual corner ratings of You Quiz on the Block. (Note: Individual corner ratings do not include commercial time, which regular ratings include.)

2018

2019

2020

2021

2022

2023

Spin-off
A 2-episode spin-off titled "It's Party Time" (난리났네 난리났어) was aired on January 28 and February 4, 2021. This spin-off invites guests who have appeared on the main show to share new stories.

Ratings
 Ratings listed below are the individual corner ratings of It's Party Time. (Note: Individual corner ratings do not include commercial time, which regular ratings include.)

Awards and nominations

State honors

References

External links 
 

2018 South Korean television series debuts
2020s South Korean television series
Korean-language television shows
South Korean variety television shows
TVN (South Korean TV channel) original programming
South Korean reality television series